The Bagnolo steles are two  stone boulders found in Ceresolo-Bagnolo, Malegno commune, Brescia province, Lombardia, Northern Italy, at the base of Monte Mignone, at an altitude of ca. 700 m. Bagnolo 1  was discovered in 1963, bearing  depictions of 14 items, engraved by hammering. Recognizable are drawings of a Sun, an axe and several daggers of the "Remedello" type, a belt and an ibex. 

In 1972, Bagnolo 2 was discovered, a similar stele with 16 engravings, showing the same daggers and axes, and a Sun, as well as a figure of a dog, and a ploughman with a team of two oxen, and patterns interpreted as necklaces and pendants. 

Fragments of other engraving were found in nearby Ossimo and Borno.

From the style of the daggers depicted, the engravings have been dated to the Italian Chalcolithic, early to mid 3rd millennium BC, probably predating the presence of Indo-Europeans on the peninsula.

See also
Rock Drawings in Valcamonica
Petroglyph
Lagundo stele
Ossimo stele
Stone stelae of the Ukraine

External links
http://www.zerla.it/stele/storia3.shtml
https://web.archive.org/web/20050125164453/http://europreart.net/cgi-bin/baserun.exe?_cfg=record.cfg&_fil=code%3D%22bgnlo001%22

Archaeological sites in Lombardy
Rock art in Europe
Prehistoric art
Buildings and structures in Lombardy
Steles